Maple Leaf is a neighbourhood in the city of Toronto, Ontario, Canada. It is located in the southwest of the North York district. Its approximate borders are Lawrence Avenue to the south, Culford Road to the west, Highway 401 to the north, and the CNR rail lines east of Keele Street to the east.

Education
Three public school boards operate schools in Maple Leaf, Conseil scolaire Viamonde (CSV), the Toronto Catholic District School Board (TCDSB), and the  Toronto District School Board (TDSB). CSV and TDSB are secular school boards, the former being a French first language school board, whereas the latter is an English first language school board. TCDSB is an English first language separate school board.

All three school boards operate elementary and middle schools in the neighbourhood. Public institutions that provide primary education include:

 Amesbury Middle School (TDSB)
 Gracefield Public School (TDSB)
 Maple Leaf Public School (TDSB)
 École élémentaire Mathieu-da-Costa (CSV)
 St. Fidelis Catholic School (TCDSB)
 St. Francis Xavier Catholic School (TCDSB)

TCDSB and TDSB are the only school boards that operate a secondary school in the neighbourhood. TDSB operates Nelson A. Boylen Collegiate Institute, a public secondary school, whereas TCDSB operates Chaminade College School, a public all-boys secondary school.

While CSV's headquarters is located in the neighbourhood, occupying the same building as École élémentaire Mathieu-da-Costa, CSV does not operate a secondary school in the neighbourhood, with CSV secondary school students residing in Maple Leaf attending institutions in adjacent neighbourhoods.

The public French first language separate school board, Conseil scolaire catholique MonAvenir (CSCM) also offer schooling to applicable residents of Maple Leaf, although they do not operate a school in the neighbourhood. CSCM students attending schools situated in other neighbourhoods in Toronto.

Recreation
Several municipal parks managed by the Toronto Parks, Forestry and Recreation Division are located in the neighbourhood. They include Maple Leaf Park, the Queen's Greenbelt, and North Park. The division also operates a community centre in Maple Leaf, Falstaff Community Centre.

Demographics
The population of Maple Leaf in 2016 was: 10,111

Major ethnic populations (2016):
 55.0% White; 35.2% Italian, 9.6% Portuguese
 12.1% Filipino
 9.7% South Asian
 8.4% East Indian
 7.8% Black; 3.7% Jamaican
 6.4% Latin American (of any race)

The population of Maple Leaf in 2011 was: 10,197

Major ethnic populations (2011):
 56.0% White; 34.8% Italian (largest concentration in Toronto), 6.8% Portuguese
 11.0% East Indian
 12.9% South Asian
 10.1% Filipino
 7.1% Black
 6.8% Latin American (of any race)

The population of Maple Leaf in 2001 was: 10,290

Major ethnic populations (2001):
 68.9% White; 40.1% Italian, 4.2% Portuguese
 9.6% South Asian
 7.0% Latin American (of any race)
 5.7% Black
 3.8% Filipino

Transportation
Several major roadways pass through the Maple Leaf, including Black Creek Drive, Keele Street, Lawrence Avenue, and controlled access highways Highway 400, and Highway 401. Lawrence Avenue is a major roadway that serves as the neighbourhood's southern boundary. Culford Road serves as the neighbourhood's western boundary. Highway 401 is a major east–west highway that passes through Greater Toronto, and serves as the neighbourhoods northern boundary.

Public transportation in the neighbourhood is provided by the Toronto Transit Commission's bus system.

References

External links
 City of Toronto - Demographics for Maple Leaf neighbourhood

Neighbourhoods in Toronto
North York